Thermal paper (sometimes referred to as an audit roll) is a special fine paper that is coated with a material formulated to change color when exposed to heat. It is used in thermal printers, particularly in inexpensive or lightweight devices such as adding machines, cash registers, and credit card terminals.

The surface of the paper is coated with a solid-state mixture of dye and a suitable matrix; a combination of a fluoran leuco dye for example. When the matrix is heated above its melting point, the dye reacts with the acid, shifts to its colored form, and the changed form is then conserved in a metastable state when the matrix solidifies back quickly enough. The reactant acid in thermal paper is often bisphenol A (BPA).

Usually, the coating will turn black when heated, but coatings that turn blue or red are sometimes used. While an open heat source, such as a flame, can discolor the paper, a fingernail swiped quickly across the paper will often generate enough heat from friction to produce a mark.

Multicolor thermal paper first became available in 1993 with the introduction of the Fuji Thermo-Autochrome (TA) system. This was followed in 2007 by Polaroid's development of the Zink ("zero-ink") system. Both of these methods rely on multi-layer coatings with three separate colorizing layers, with different methods used for independent activation of each layer.

History 
The earliest direct thermal papers were developed by NCR Corporation (using dye chemistry) and 3M (using metallic salts). The NCR technology became the market leader over time, although the image would fade rather rapidly compared with the much more expensive, but durable 3M technology.

Texas Instruments invented the thermal print head in 1965, and the Silent 700, a computer terminal with a thermal printer, was released in the market in 1969. The Silent 700 was the first thermal print system that printed on thermal paper. During the 1970s, Hewlett-Packard integrated thermal paper printers into the design of its HP9800 series desktop computers, and integrated it into the top of the 2600-series CRT terminals as well as in plotters.

In the 1970s and early 1980s, Japanese producers (such as Ricoh, Jujo, and Kanzaki), using similar dye-based chemistry, formed partnerships with barcode printer manufacturers (such as TEC, Sato, and others) and entered the emerging global bar code industry, primarily in supermarkets. U.S. producers such as Appleton (NCR's licensee), Nashua Corporation, Graphic Controls, and others fought to gain market share. Leading pressure-sensitive label producers such as Avery Dennison became major consumers of direct thermal paper for label applications.

In the late 1980s and early 1990s, thermal transfer, laser printing, electrophotography, and, to a lesser extent, ink jet printing began to take away industrial and warehouse barcode applications due to better durability.  Direct thermal made a strong comeback with point of sale receipts (gasoline pumps, cash registers, rental car receipts, etc.).

During 1998, Nintendo used thermal paper technology for their Game Boy Printer.

In 2006, NCR Corporation's Systemedia division introduced two-sided thermal printing technology, called "2ST".

Chemistry 

Four different types of imaging chemicals are used in thermally sensitive papers: leuco dyes, developers, sensitizers and stabilizers.

 Leuco dyes The leuco dyes used in direct thermal paper are usually triaryl methane phthalide dyes  , such as   Yamamoto Blue 4450, or  fluoran dyes, such as   Pergascript Black 2C. A third widely used leuco dye is Crystal violet lactone. Red or magenta color can be achieved with dyes such as Yamamoto Red 40. Yellow can be produced by the protonation of a triaryl pyridine, such as Copikem Yellow 37.  These dyes have a colorless leuco form when crystalline or when in a pH neutral environment, but become colored when dissolved in a melt and exposed to an acidic environment.
 Developers Leuco dyes, in general, provide little color when melted unless they are melted in conjunction with one or more organic acids.  Examples of organic acids suitable for thermochromic papers are phenols such as Bisphenol A (BPA) and Bisphenol S (BPS). Other suitable acidic materials are sulfonyl ureas such as BTUM and Pergafast 201. Zinc salts of substituted salicylic acids, such as zinc di-tert-butylsalicylate have also been commercially used as  developers    .
 Sensitizers A leuco dye and a developer, when melted together, are enough to produce color. However, the thermal threshold of the coated layer containing the colorizing components is determined by the lowest melting component of the layer. Furthermore, developers and leuco dyes often mix poorly upon melting.  To optimize the colorization temperature and to facilitate mixing, a third chemical called a sensitizer is commonly added to the imaging layer. Sensitizers are commonly simple ether molecules such as 1,2-bis-(3-methylphenoxy)ethane or 2-benzyloxynapthalene. These two materials melt at approximately 100°C, which is a practical lower limit for thermal coloration. These low-cost ethers are excellent low viscosity solvents for leuco dyes and developers, and this facilitates color formation at a well-defined temperature and with minimum energy input.
 Stabilizers Dyes in thermally sensitive paper are often unstable and return to their original colorless, crystalline forms when stored in hot or humid conditions.  To stabilize the metastable glass formed by the leuco dye, developer and sensitizer, a fourth type of material called a stabilizer is often added to thermal papers.  Stabilizers often share similarities with developers and are often complex multifunctional phenols that inhibit recrystallization of the dye and developer, thereby stabilizing the printed image.

Multicolored papers 

In the early 2000s, Polaroid developed the Zink "zero-ink" technology.  The paper is used in compact photo printers. It has several layers: a backing layer with optional pressure sensitive adhesive, heat-sensitive layers with cyan, magenta and yellow pigments in colorless form, and overcoat. Zink technology allows the printing of full-color images in a single pass without requiring ink cartridges. The color addressing is achieved by controlling the heat pulse length and intensity. The color-forming layers contain colorless crystals of amorphochromic dyes. These dyes form microcrystals of their colorless tautomers, which convert to the colored form by melting and retain color after resolidification. The yellow layer is the topmost one, sensitive to short heat pulses of high temperature. The magenta layer is in the middle, sensitive to longer pulses of moderate temperature. The cyan layer is at the bottom, sensitive to long pulses of low temperature. The layers are separated by thin interlayers, acting as heat insulation, moderating the heat throughput.

Protective coating 
Most direct thermal papers require a protective top-coating to:
 reduce fading of the thermal image caused by exposure to UV light, water, oils, grease, lard, fats, plasticizers, and similar causes
 reduce print head wear
 reduce or eliminate residue from the thermal coating on the thermal print heads
 provide better anchorage of flexographic printing inks applied to the thermal paper
 focus the heat from the thermal print head on the active coating.

Health and environmental concerns 
Some thermal papers are coated with BPA, a chemical considered to be an endocrine disruptor.  This material can contaminate recycled paper. BPA can transfer readily to the skin in small amounts:

The chemical bisphenol A (BPA) is used for thermal paper coatings because of its stability and heat-resistance. This allows inkless printing for receipts from cash registers. People who often are in contact with BPA coated receipts do have a higher level of BPA in their bodies than people with average contact. Therefore, the New York Suffolk County signed a resolution to ban BPA in thermal receipt papers. Violation of this new law, the "Safer Sales Slip Act", involves a US$500 penalty. The law became effective beginning January 3, 2014.

Recently, bisphenol S (BPS), an analog of BPA that has been shown to have similar in vitro estrogenic activity to BPA, has been used in thermal paper coatings. The recycling of thermal paper coated with BPS can introduce BPS into the cycle of paper production and cause BPS contamination of other types of paper products.

Newer formulations can be purchased which are "phenol free" and use either urea based compounds or vitamin-c. The phenol free variants such as urea based can have comparable or even improved print quality, however it can cost more.

References

External links 
 Texas Instruments-Computers & Software and Industrial Controls
 Silent 700 Electronic Data Terminals, 1976(PDF)
 2ST Two-Sided Thermal Printing National Cash Register
 Thermal Paper

Coated paper
Office equipment